Basket-Hall Kazan is a basketball specialized indoor arena that is located in Kazan, Russia. It is primarily used for basketball, but it can also be used for volleyball and concerts. It contains two basketball halls.

The large main hall, called Basket-Hall 1, has a seating capacity of 7,482 people for basketball and 8,000 for concerts. The large main hall also includes an amphitheater section. The small hall, called Basket-Hall 2, which is mainly used for training, has a seating capacity of 1,500.

History
The arena opened in August 2003, at a construction cost of $14 million. In 2011, it hosted the 2011 European Weightlifting Championships. Basket-Hall was also a venue of the 2013 Summer Universiade. The arena has been used as the regular home arena of the Russian VTB United League basketball club UNICS Kazan. It was also previously used by the Russian volleyball club VC Zenit-Kazan.

The arena was renovated in 2017.

See also
 List of indoor arenas in Russia

References

External links
Basket Hall Kazan info at Odak Group
Basket-Hall Kazan at UNICS Kazan Website 
Image Of Basket-Hall Kazan 1 Interior
Image of Basket-Hall Kazan 2 Interior

Indoor arenas in Russia
Music venues in Russia
Basketball venues in Russia
Sport in Kazan
Buildings and structures in Kazan
Volleyball venues in Russia